The Río Gurabo Formation is a geologic formation in the northwestern Dominican Republic. The reefal limestone preserves bivalve, gastropod and coral fossils dating back to the Messinian to Zanclean period.

See also 
 List of fossiliferous stratigraphic units in the Dominican Republic

References

Further reading 
 J. S. Klaus, S. T. Murray, P. K. Swart and D. F. McNeill. 2013. Resource partitioning and paleoecology of Neogene free-living corals as determined from skeletal stable isotope composition. Bulletin of marine science 84(4):937-954
 J. B. Saunders, P. Jung, and B. Biju-Duval. 1986. Neogene Paleontology in the Northern Dominican Republic: 1. Field Surveys, Lithology, Environment, and Age. Bulletins of American Paleontology 89(323):1-79

Geologic formations of the Dominican Republic
Neogene Dominican Republic
Limestone formations
Reef deposits